The English School is a selective secondary school in Nicosia, Cyprus. It has a rigorous selection process for admittance. It is one of the secondary schools in Nicosia designated to be bi-communal, with both Greek and Turkish Cypriots being educated at the school.

History
The school was founded in 1900 by an Anglican clergyman, Canon Frank Darvall Newham and since its inception the school has offered a British-style secondary level education. Originally it only accepted the children of the British rulers of the island and was located within the medieval walls of Nicosia. Over the years it accepted Cypriot pupils too and moved to its current premises in 1939. Although a boys school at first, girls were first allowed in 1957 into an affiliated school which was then incorporated as a co-educational school in 1962.

The school started off as a private venture but control was transferred to the British Governor in 1930. Following independence from British occupation in 1960, control passed to the Cypriot Government. In 2007, the school's status and eligibility for state grants was challenged at the Supreme Court.

It is a highly selective academic co-educational secondary school and most of its leavers attend universities in Great Britain. Although previously a boarding school, it currently operates as a day school.

Intercommunal history
In 1958, EOKA distributed a text threatening Greek Cypriots that attended the school. This resulted in the parents removing students from the school and the number of Greek Cypriots attending fell from 317 to 21.

Following the Turkish invasion of Cyprus in 1974, Turkish Cypriot students withdrew from the school. From September 2003, however, the school returned to its bi-communal status by re-enrolling Turkish Cypriots.

In November 2006, Turkish Cypriot students were attacked at The English School by what was believed to be extremist members of "National Voice of Youth with a Greek Soul" (Ε.Φ.Ε.Ν). This followed reports that a Greek Cypriot student had been spat at for wearing a cross. The attackers were not other English School students. At the time, The US Department of State released the following statement:
 	
"In April 2007 court proceedings began for 13 suspects charged with attacking Turkish Cypriot students. On November 22, 2006, 15 to 20 Greek Cypriot teenagers, believed to be members of an ultranationalist group, National Voice of Youth with a Greek Soul, entered the English School in Nicosia and attacked a group of Turkish Cypriot students, causing minor injuries. Reports in the Greek Cypriot press about an earlier incident at the same school, which reported that an 11-year-old male Turkish Cypriot student verbally insulted a Greek Cypriot student wearing a Christian cross, were blamed for inciting the latter event. The Government condemned the November 22 attack as an aberration, not indicative of a broader atmosphere of discrimination or racial hatred against Turkish Cypriots."

Curriculum
The school has the following 16 departments:

 Art and Design (see below)
 Biology
 Business
 Chemistry
 Computer Science (see below)
 Design & Technology (see below)
 Economics
 English
 Geography
 Greek
 Global Perspectives
 History 
 Mathematics
 Modern Languages (see below)
 Music (see below)
 Physical Education (see below)
 Physics
 PSHCE
 Turkish

A Religious Instruction department also exists, but classes are optional as they are available only to Greek-Orthodox, Armenian-Orthodox and Maronite-Catholic students. Religious Education is also available for students who do not wish to partake in Religious Instruction; lessons review a more general overview of various faiths and their histories.

Grounds
The school is situated in a semi-wooded parkland near the centre of the capital Nicosia and is one of the largest school campus in Cyprus. The school's extensive sport grounds include a large multi-purpose indoor sports centre, a full size football field, four futsal fields, running and athletics tracks, three tennis courts, and a (lawn) hockey field. In 2017 construction commenced on a new building, the Newham building. The school has five buildings, the Lloyds building, the main building, the Newham building, the science building and the sports centre. These buildings surround a large area with benches for the students.

Houses
The school operates a house system like many other British public schools. Pupils are randomly placed in one of four houses. These houses are Wolseley, Newham, Beaconsfield and Kitchener.  This system mainly nurtures sporting competitions among the houses, each house has associated colours.

Alumni
The school maintains an active alumni network, with a clubhouse  found in the school's grounds.

Notable alumni include:
 Rauf Denktaş, Turkish Cypriot politician
 Alex Michaelides, writer
 Kypros Nicolaides, pioneer in fetal medicine
 Stephanie Solomonides, first Cypriot to reach North and South Poles
 Curtis Yarvin, computer scientist, political philosopher, neoreactionary thinker
In 2010, a book was published to list the notable Turkish Cypriot alumni of the school.

References

External links
 The English School website
 ESOBGA (English School Old Boys and Girls Association)

Educational institutions established in 1900
British international schools in Asia
Nicosia
International schools in Cyprus
Education in Nicosia
1900 establishments in Cyprus